Bordeaux is a city in France. It may also refer to:

Places

Habitation
 Bordeaux Métropole, the intercommunality containing the city
 Roman Catholic Archdiocese of Bordeaux, a religious subdivision surrounding the city of Bordeaux
 University of Bordeaux
 Bordeaux–Mérignac Airport, the airport serving Bordeaux
 Bordeaux, Gauteng, a suburb of Johannesburg in South Africa
 Bordeaux Harbour, a port on the Channel Island of Guernsey
 Bordeaux-Cartierville, a neighbourhood in Ahuntsic-Cartierville in Montreal
 Bordeaux, Limpopo, a town in the Limpopo province of South Africa
 Bordeaux, Nebraska, a community in the United States
 Bordeaux, South Carolina, an unincorporated community in the United States
 Bordeaux, St. John, U.S. Virgin Islands, a community in Saint John, U.S. Virgin Islands
 Bordeaux, St. Thomas, U.S. Virgin Islands, an estate in Saint Thomas, U.S. Virgin Islands
 Bordeaux, Washington, an unincorporated community in the United States
 Bordeaux, Wyoming, an unincorporated community in the United States

Geography
 Bordeaux (crater), a crater on Mars
 Bordeaux Creek, stream in Dawes County, Nebraska in the United States
 Bordeaux Mountain on the island of Saint John, U.S. Virgin Islands

Wine
 Bordeaux wine, wine grown in the region around Bordeaux
 Bordeaux wine regions, the different AOCs and regions of Bordeaux
 Bordeaux Wine Official Classification of 1855, 19th century classification of Bordeaux wine estates
 Bordeaux mixture, a chemical recipe used to control fungus
 Plan Bordeaux, an initiative intended to avoid surplus wine

People (real and fictional)
 Andrée Bordeaux-Le Pecq (1910–1973), French illustrator
 Edmund Bordeaux Szekely (1905–1979), Hungarian philologist/linguist, philosopher, psychologist
 Henry Bordeaux (1870–1963), a French lawyer and writer
 Huon of Bordeaux, a character in an epic French poem
 Joe Bordeaux (1886–1950), American film actor
 Meredith Bordeaux (1912–2014), American politician in the state of Maine
 Nanette Bordeaux (1911–1956), French Canadian-born American film actress
 Richard Bordeaux Parker (1923–2011), an American diplomat
 Sasha Bordeaux, a comic book character
 Scarlett Bordeaux, American professional wrestler
 Shawn Bordeaux, American politician from South Dakota

Other
 Bordeaux mixture, a mixture of copper sulfate and slaked lime used as a fungicide in vineyards, fruit-farms and gardens
 Dogue de Bordeaux, a breed of dog
 FC Girondins de Bordeaux, an association football team in Bordeaux
 LGV Bordeaux-Toulouse, a high-speed rail line
 Bordeaux–Paris, a cycling race
 Fedora (operating system), a Linux-based operating system which was under the codename "Bordeaux"
 Bordeaux, a record album composed by Robin Guthrie of Cocteau Twins and Harold Budd

 Bordelaise sauce, a classic French sauce

See also
 :Category:Bordeaux
 Bourdeaux
 Bourdeau